A fibrous tissue neoplasm is a tumor derived primarily from Fibrous connective tissue.

An example is fibroma.

See also
 Fibroepithelial neoplasms

References

External links 

Connective/soft tissue tumors and sarcomas